Lecithocera semnodora is a moth in the family Lecithoceridae. It was described by Edward Meyrick in 1933. It is found in the Democratic Republic of the Congo in the provinces of Katanga, Kasai-Occidental and Équateur.

References

Moths described in 1933
theconoma